Nowy Gaj is a village in the administrative district of Gmina Wojciechów, within Lublin County, Lublin Voivodeship, in eastern Poland.

The village has a population of 60.

References

Villages in Lublin County